The following is a list of churches in Blackpool, Lancashire.

List 

 Christ Church Blackpool
 Bispham Parish Church
 Church of St Stephen on-the-Cliffs, Blackpool
 St Thomas' Church, Blackpool
 Holy Trinity Church, Blackpool
 Sacred Heart Church, Blackpool
 Shrine of Our Lady of Lourdes, Blackpool
 St John's Church, Blackpool
 St Mark's Church, Blackpool

Blackpool
Churches in Blackpool